Supranet is a term coined at the turn of the 21st century by information technology analysis firm Gartner to describe the fusion of the physical and the digital (virtual) worlds, a concept that embeds the "Internet of things" as one of its elements.

History 

At its inception in 2000, the term was alluding to the ongoing convergence of the Internet, mobile communications, always-on connectivity, sensors and advanced human-computer interaction. In subsequent elaborations, it was extended to include electronic tagging (via, for example, RFID), geotagging and electronic geomapping (i.e., mapping internet coordinates to geodetic coordinates), thereby completing the fusion of physical and virtual.

Paradigm 

Collectively, those publications anticipated the following trends, all subsumed under the "Supranet" heading:

 The increase of miniature intelligent devices, such as microelectromechanical systems or RFID tags, already numbered by the billions in 2001;
 The electronic coding of physical objects (from consumer goods to cars, from drugs to clothing, from banknotes and sheets of paper), which makes them all uniquely identifiable;
 The fact that all or most such objects will be networked via the wireless Internet (the "Internet of things");
 The fact that all humans (or animals) carrying such objects will be networked and identifiable;
 The fact that the geographic location of many such entities (animals and physical objects) will be known with increasing precision;
 The fact that the planet's surface will be mapped in the internet, either via ad hoc GIS's or in more-definitive ways such as assigning an IP address to every square meter on earth.

Practical aspects 

A practical common example of Supranet is photography geotagging, as it can be done in Flickr, Panoramio or Picasa, perhaps (although not necessarily) using GPS-enabled cameras. However, applications will be only limited by the users' imagination. It will be possible to attach electronic information to places, from the botanic description of plants on mountain trails to the projection of ancient Rome onto the actual vision of the current landscape from the Pincio; it will be possible for products to self-determine their paths along supply chains, and to auto-assemble; it will be possible to grow cyborgs resembling fiction characters. Moving across the three-dimensional physical space will match movements in the digital/virtual one, and vice versa. The threshold between space and cyberspace blurs, and eventually it may even be unclear whether we are in one or in the other.

The concept of Supranet has been ever since talked about in the media, as well as used in scientific research and product development; one remarkable example of large-scale project heavily influenced by the Supranet is "Virtual Australia".

In some of his subsequent works (such as), one of the original Gartner authors made it clear that there were several precursors to the concept of Supranet, crediting David Gelernter, G.W. Fitzmaurice and J.C. Spohrer as the pioneers.

See also 

 Augmented reality
 Augmented virtuality
 Holodeck
 Internet of things
 Mixed reality
 Metaverse
 Object hyperlinking
 Simulated reality
 Ubiquitous computing
 Utility fog
 Virtuality Continuum
 Virtual reality

References 

Computer jargon
Radio-frequency identification
Internet of things